Vimolj is a small settlement immediately north of Banja Loka in the Municipality of Kostel in southern Slovenia. The area is part of the traditional region of Lower Carniola and is now included in the Southeast Slovenia Statistical Region.

References

External links
Vimolj on Geopedia

Populated places in the Municipality of Kostel